The List of historic places in Wellington contains the heritage sites and buildings from Wellington registered in the New Zealand Heritage List/Rārangi Kōrero (formerly the Register).

The New Zealand Heritage List is maintained and updated by Heritage New Zealand (aka Heritage New Zealand Pouhere Taonga, initially the National Historic Places Trust and, from 1963 to 2014, the New Zealand Historic Places Trust).

See also
 List of category 1 historic places in Auckland
 List of category 2 historic places in Auckland
 List of historic places in New Plymouth

References

Bibliography 
 Heritage New Zealand,  New Zealand Heritage List

External links 
 
 

Buildings and structures in Wellington City
Wellington